Caught in the Middle is the second studio album by the freestyle-pop group Linear, released in 1992 by Atlantic Records. While the album's first single, "TLC", peaked at No. 30 on the Billboard Hot 100, Caught in the Middle did not chart.

Track listing

Charts 

Singles - Billboard (North America)

References 

1992 albums
Atlantic Records albums
Linear (group) albums